The 9th Infantry Regiment "Bari" is an active unit of the Italian Army based in Trani in Apulia. The regiment is part of the Italian army's infantry corps and operationally assigned to the Mechanized Brigade "Pinerolo".

Current structure 
As of 2019 the 9th Infantry Regiment "Bari" consists of:

  Regimental Command, in Trani
 Command and Logistic Support Company
 1st Infantry Battalion
 1st Fusiliers Company
 2nd Fusiliers Company
 3rd Fusiliers Company
 Maneuver Support Company

The Command and Logistic Support Company fields the following platoons: C3 Platoon, Transport and Materiel Platoon, Medical Platoon, and Commissariat Platoon. The regiment is equipped with Freccia wheeled infantry fighting vehicles. The Maneuver Support Company is equipped with Freccia mortar carries with 120mm mortars and Freccia IFVs with Spike LR anti-tank guided missiles.

See also 
 Mechanized Brigade "Pinerolo"

External links
Italian Army Website: 9° Reggimento Fanteria "Bari"

References

Infantry Regiments of Italy